The lesser of two evils principle, also referred to as the lesser evil principle and lesser-evilism, is the principle that when faced with selecting from two immoral options, the least immoral one should be chosen. The principle is sometimes recalled in reference to binary political choices in democratic voting under a two-party system.

Origin 

The maxim existed already in Platonic philosophy. In Nicomachean Ethics, Aristotle writes: "For the lesser evil can be seen in comparison with the greater evil as a good, since this lesser evil is preferable to the greater one, and whatever preferable is good". The modern formulation was popularized by Thomas à Kempis' devotional book The Imitation of Christ written in early 15th century.

In part IV of his Ethics, Spinoza states the following maxim:

In modern elections 
In 2012, Huffington Post columnist Sanford Jay Rosen stated that the idea became common practice for left-leaning voters in the United States due to their overwhelming disapproval of the United States government's support for the Vietnam War. Rosen stated: "Beginning with the 1968 presidential election, I often have heard from liberals that they could not vote for the lesser of two evils. Some said they would not vote; some said they would vote for a third-party candidate. That mantra delivered us to Richard Nixon in 1972 until Watergate did him in. And it delivered us to George W. Bush and Dick Cheney in 2000 until they were termed out in 2009". 

In the 2016 United States presidential election, both major candidates of the major parties — Hillary Clinton (D) and Donald Trump (R) — had disapproval ratings close to 60% by August 2016. Green Party candidate Jill Stein invoked this idea in her campaign stating, "Don't vote for the lesser evil, fight for the greater good". Green Party votes hurt Democratic chances in 2000 and 2016. Accordingly, the lesser evil principle can be applied to two front-runners among many choices, after eliminating from consideration "minor party candidates (who) can be spoilers in elections by taking away enough votes from a major party candidate to influence the outcome without winning."

In his DarkHorse podcast, Bret Weinstein describes his Unity 2020 proposal for the 2020 presidential election as an option that, in case of failure, would not asymmetrically weaken voters' second-best choice on a single political side, thereby avoiding the lesser evil paradox.

In elections between only two candidates where one is mildly unpopular and the other immensely unpopular, opponents of both candidates frequently advocate a vote for the mildly unpopular candidate. For example, in the second round of the 2002 French presidential election graffiti in Paris told people to "vote for the crook, not the fascist". The "crook" in those scribbled public messages was Jacques Chirac of Rally for the Republic and the "fascist" was Jean-Marie Le Pen of the National Front. Chirac eventually won the second round having garnered 82% of the vote.

The principle of "the lesser of two evils" is sometimes jokingly changed to "the evil of two lessers", such as in the titles of these articles about the US presidential elections of 1988 and 2016.

Mythology 
"Between Scylla and Charybdis" is an idiom derived from Homer's Odyssey. In the story, Odysseus chose to go near Scylla as the lesser of two evils. He lost six of his companions, but if he had gone near Charybdis all would be doomed. Because of such stories, having to navigate between the two hazards eventually entered idiomatic use. Another equivalent English seafaring phrase is "Between a rock and a hard place". The Latin line incidit in scyllam cupiens vitare charybdim ("he runs into Scylla, wishing to avoid Charybdis") had earlier become proverbial, with a meaning much the same as  jumping from the frying pan into the fire. Erasmus recorded it as an ancient proverb in his Adagia, although the earliest known instance is in the Alexandreis, a 12th-century Latin epic poem by Walter of Châtillon.

See also 
 Binary opposition
 Consequentialism 
 Dilemma
 False dilemma
 Minimax
 Mouseland
 Necessary evil
 Principle of double effect
 Two wrongs make a right
 Trolley problem
 Ticking time bomb scenario

References

External links 

Political campaign techniques
International relations
Dilemmas
Ethical principles
Good and evil